Ingo van Weert (born 8 February 1994) is a Dutch professional footballer who plays as a right-back or centre-back for SteDoCo.

After playing for RKC Waalwijk for seven years, van Weert signed a two-year contract with Polish second tier club Stomil Olsztyn on 5 August 2020.

References

External links
 

1994 births
Living people
People from Heusden
Footballers from North Brabant
Association football central defenders
Dutch footballers
RKC Waalwijk players
OKS Stomil Olsztyn players
Eredivisie players
Eerste Divisie players
I liga players
Dutch expatriate footballers
Expatriate footballers in Poland
Dutch expatriate sportspeople in Poland